King Sisavangvong (14 July 1885 – 29 October 1959) Born Prince Khao , was one of the last kings of Luang Prabang, ruling from 28th of April 1904 until his death on the 29th of October 1959. According to Lao customs, while being crowned khao would be given a Courtesy name Sisavangvong and be addressed by his courtesy name until his death.

Early life

Prince Khao was born in the Golden Palace (during his father's reign) on 14th July, 1885, as the eldest surviving son of His Majesty King Zakarinth and second wife Her majesty Queen consort Thong-sy. However, in boyhood Khao was sent to study at Lycée Chasseloup-Laubat, Saigon and l'École Coloniale, where he would return to ascend the throne.

Ascension 
Prince Khao was named heir apparent on 15th of April 1904, upon his father's death on the 26th of March 1904, Khao was to ascend the throne at the Old Royal Palace, in Luang Prabang. In which the young Prince Khao was crowned on the 4th of March 1905, as His Majesty King Sisavangvong.

Early Reign 
During the early years of his reign, the French built a modern palace for his residence, the Royal Palace of Luang Prabang. Under his kingdom he had united provinces Houaphan, 1931; Houakhong; Xiengkhouang and Vientiane, 1942; Champassak and Sayboury, 1946.

He was a lifelong supporter of French rule in Laos. In 1945 he refused to cooperate with Lao nationalists and was deposed when the Lao Issara declared the country independent. In April 1946, the French took over once again and he was reinstated as king (the first time in almost 250 years that a Lao monarch actually ruled all of what is today called Laos).

Upon Sisavang Vong's death in 1959, he had ruled Luang Prabang and Laos for 55 years. At the time of his death, he was the longest-reigning monarch in the history of modern Laos.

When he became ill, he made his son Crown Prince Savang Vatthana regent. His son succeeded him on his death in 1959. He was cremated and buried in Vat That Luang (Luang Prabang) in 1961, and during his funeral procession was transported by the royal funeral carriage, a 12-metre-high wooden hearse with a carved seven-headed serpent. Many representatives were at the state funeral including Prince Bhanubandhu Yugala, who represented Thailand.

Sisavangvong University was named in his honour, but was abolished in 1975 when the communists took power in Laos.

Because he presided over independence from the French Union, statues of him survived the communist revolution and remain in Luang Prabang and Vientiane. Both statues depict him in the act of bestowing a constitution upon the people.

Family
Sisavang Vong has been described as the "playboy king". He had 10 wives and 50 children, 14 of which died in a boating accident on the Mekong River.

Wives:

 Princess Kamuni (1885–1915)

Khamphane (1896–1983), his half sister by his father's wife Mom La; they had no children
Khamla, a commoner
Khamboua, a commoner
Khamtip, a commoner
Princess Khamtouan of Luang Prabang, his half sister (one son)
Princess Kamaduni of the Vang Hnaxxs family
Mom Khamphoui, a commoner
Princess Indrakama, a daughter of Prince Jayasena, Prince Sri Dibudinha and his wife, Pong
Princess Kamuni, daughter of Prince Ko and Princess Duangbadani
Princess Khamphoui, the daughter of his half-brother
Chansy (1900–1984), a commoner

Honours
Grand Cross of the Royal Order of Cambodia – 1905
Grand Cross of the Order of the Dragon of Annam – 1905
Decoration of the Golden Gong, 1st Class of Annam
Grand Cross of the Legion d'Honneur of France – 1927  (Commander – 1905)
Grand Officer of the Order of the Black Star of Benin of France – 1935
Grand Officer of the Order of the Crown of Belgium – 1935
Officer of the Order of Arts and Letters of France – 1949
Croix de Guerre with Palm of France – 1949
Knight of the Order of the Royal House of Chakri of Thailand – 1955
Grand Cross of the National Order of Merit of Vietnam – 1955

See also
Monarchs of Laos

References

1885 births
1959 deaths
Monarchs of Laos
People from Luang Prabang

Grand Officers of the Order of the Crown (Belgium)
Grand Croix of the Légion d'honneur
Knights Grand Cross of the Royal Order of Cambodia
Officiers of the Ordre des Arts et des Lettres
Recipients of the Croix de guerre des théâtres d'opérations extérieures
Laotian anti-communists
19th-century Laotian people